The Purple Rose Theatre Company is a Michigan not-for-profit theatre company founded in 1991 by Jeff Daniels in an old pizza parlor/garage in Chelsea. Its name comes from the 1985 film The Purple Rose of Cairo, which starred Daniels and for which he earned his first Golden Globe nomination.

History 
In the early 1900s, Jeff Daniels’ grandfather owned the building that would one day become the Purple Rose as a car and bus garage. Other business in the same building included a gas station, pizza parlor, and vegetable stand. In 1989, the building was renovated by Daniels to be donated to the Purple Rose.

The building is in the historic district of downtown Chelsea. The lobby features 1930′s décor – including marbled glass chandeliers and an art deco box office. In 2018, the lobby (including its bathrooms) was renovated including updated carpeting, new bathrooms, and white walls with purple accents.

The Purple Rose produces 4 shows a year. In 2017, the Purple Rose produced its 100th production with the revival of Vino Veritas by Michigan playwright David MacGregor.

Performance space 
In 1999, a capital campaign worth $2.2 million was launched with the aim to expand the building including the stage, lobby, and administrative spaces. During renovations, the building closed for a year and a half to reopen in January, 2001. The mortgage for the building was paid off in March, 2004.

The renovated stage space is a ¾ thrust with 168 seats with each seat five rows back or less.

In 2017, a two-phase roof renovation project was completed that raised the roof in the backstage area to accommodate more ceiling space above the stage – approximately 1,000 Square Feet. The project was completed with the help of the Michigan Council for the Arts & Cultural Affairs.

Notable artists 
Guy Sanville was Artistic Director for over 20 years. In those years, Sanville  directed over 60 productions, and performed in 12 – including The Tropical Pickle, A Stone Carver and The Odd Couple as Oscar. Sanville retired in 2021 amidst accusations of creating a toxic work environment.

Five actors have performed over 1,000 times on the Purple Rose stage: Wayne David “Daba” Parker, Tom Whalen, Rhiannon Ragland, Jim Porterfield, and Michelle Mountain – who has over 2,000 performances.

Three stage managers have worked over 1,000 performances at the Purple Rose: Amy (Hickman) Klain, Steph (Buck) Ogden, and Thomas Macias.

Danna Segrest has worked on over 100 productions at the Purple Rose, the vast majority as props designer.

Gary Ciarkowski has worked at the theatre for over 20 years as the Master Electrician & Technical Director. He has also designed sets for 5 productions including Diva Royale and 2AZ.

Dana White has worked on over 50 productions at the Purple Rose, the vast majority as lighting designer. In 2015, White was awarded a Roy Bowen Lifetime Achievement Award from The Central Ohio Theatre Critics Circle.

Bart Bauer, one of the founding members of the theatre, has designed over 35 sets for the Purple Rose including the Sherlock Holmes world premieres and Annapurna.

Television stars and real-life brothers Matt & Brian Letscher both got both their acting and playwriting starts at the Purple Rose.

Carey Crim is a Michigan playwright with 5 world-premieres produced at the Purple Rose. Crim, daughter of famed Detroit Broadcast Journalist Mort Crim, started at the Purple Rose as an actor. Most recently, she had her plays Morning After Grace and Never Not Once appear on the Purple Rose stage. Morning After Grace has since had runs at Royal Manitoba Theatre Company, Asolo Rep, and Shakespeare and Co.

David MacGregor is another Michigan playwright with 6 productions at the Purple Rose. MacGregor is in the process of creating a trilogy of plays about Sherlock Holmes. The first play involves Vincent Van Gogh and Oscar Wilde, and the second involves Auguste Escoffier and Prince Albert Edward.

Emergency! TV star Randolph Mantooth has performed in two productions at the Purple Rose: Superior Donuts by Tracy Letts & the world premiere Morning After Grace by Carey Crim.

Productions

Notable productions 
In 1995, Daniels wrote Escanaba in Da Moonlight about a hunting lodge in the Upper Peninsula (The U.P.) of Michigan. This was the first of three plays Daniels wrote about “Yoopers” (residents of the U.P.), the other two being Escanaba in Love in 2006, and Escanaba in 2009.

In 1997 the Purple Rose produced Hot l Baltimore written by Pulitzer Prize-winning playwright, Lanford Wilson. This production was the first play of Wilson's performed at the Purple Rose, and one of only two plays directed by Jeff Daniels. Wilson eventually ended up writing Book of Days (1998) and Rain Dance (2000) for the theatre, his final two plays before he died in 2011.

In 2017, the Purple Rose produced Willow Run, a play about Rosie the Riveters who worked at the Willow Run bomber plant in Ypsilanti, Michigan. On August 18, nine original Rosies attended the performance.

Onstage & Unplugged 
Starting in 2001, Daniels started performing a holiday concert titled “Onstage & Unplugged” where he sings and plays guitar for a limited engagement of shows as a fundraiser for the theatre. Jeff plays original music and sometimes is joined onstage by close musician friends such as Brad Phillips, the Ben Daniels Band, and Brian Vander Ark.

Critical reception and awards 
In 1994, Detroit News named The Purple Rose “Theatre of the Year”.

In 1998, the American Theatre Critics Association awarded the “Best New Play” award to Book of Days by Lanford Wilson.

The Purple Rose has won three Edgerton Foundation New Play awards – for White Buffalo (2011), Gaps in the Fossil Record (2015), & Willow Run (2017). The award allows theaters to pay artists for a week of rehearsal and workshops.

In February 2013, the Chelsea Area Chamber of Commerce awarded the Purple Rose with the Large Business Leadership Award.

In September 2016, during their 25th anniversary fundraiser, The Senior Senator from Michigan, Debbie Stabenow, presented a commendation to the Purple Rose, applauding its cultural and economic impact in South East Michigan.

Wilde Awards 
Since 2002, the Wilde Awards have recognized Michigan's professional theatre community. The Purple Rose has won 24 of these Wilde Awards, out of a total of 129 nominations.

Apprenticeship Program 
The Purple Rose formerly offered a year-long apprenticeship program for young artists entering a career in theatre. Apprentices were paid a modest stipend and worked as many as 80 hours per week gaining experience in lighting, sound, stage management, design, set construction, and administrative/box office work. The seven apprentices also maintained and cleaned the theatre's facilities. The program was inspired by Daniels' experience as an apprentice with the Circle Repertory Company in New York City.

Former apprentices currently working at the Purple Rose include Katie Hubbard (managing director), Amy Klain (company manager).

The Purple Rose discontinued the apprentice program in 2021, following longstanding claims of toxic and abusive treatment of apprentices by staff, including artistic director Guy Sanville. A 22-page letter, signed by 77 former Purple Rose artists, alleges homophobic, racist, and fatphobic atttitudes, and a regular pattern of hazing, going back decades.

Films 
In 2001, Purple Rose Films produced Escanaba in da Moonlight, based on the play of the same name written by Jeff Daniels. The film includes nine actors associated with the Purple Rose Theatre, including Jim Porterfield and Wayne David “Daba” Parker, who played Alphonse & Da Jimmer respectively in the play and the film.

In 2002, Purple Rose Films produced an original movie entitled Super Sucker, a story about vacuum cleaner salesmen. The film was shot entirely in Jackson, Michigan. Eleven actors in the film were associated with the Purple Rose Theatre, including Jeff Daniels, Matt Letscher, Guy Sanville, and Michelle Mountain.

In 2013, Blue Frog Productions produced Vino Veritas, based on the play of the same name written by David MacGregor. The film was shot in Lincoln, Nebraska.

In 2017, Mirrorcore Productions produced Wake, based on the play of the same name written by Carey Crim. The film was shot in California.

In 2017, Grand River Productions produced Guest Artist, based on the play of the same name written by Jeff Daniels. The film is almost entirely cast with actors from the Purple Rose including Jeff Daniels, Richard McWilliams (Harvey as Elwood P. Dowd & All My Sons as Joe Keller) and Thomas Macias, who started at the Purple Rose as an apprentice in 2013. The film was directed by Timothy Busfield and was shot on location in New York City, New York and Chelsea, Michigan.

In 2019, Doorstop Productions produced a short film called Just Desserts, based on the short play of the same name written by David MacGregor. The film was shot in Orange, New Jersey.

Television 
In October 2015, Purple Rose: 25 Years premiered on Detroit Public Television. This documentary, produced by 2188, features the story of the Purple Rose with stories and interviews from some of the artists associated with the theatre.

In October 2017, the Purple Rose was featured along with Cornelia Sampson and the Guadalupe Arts and Culture Center in an episode of Detroit Performs.

See also

 Jeff Daniels – Founder
Lanford Wilson – Playwright – Mentor to Jeff Daniels

References

External links
 The Purple Rose Theatre Company official website

Theatres in Michigan
Chelsea, Michigan
1991 establishments in Michigan